The Festival Nacional de la Quenepa (English: National Genip Fruit Festival) is a cultural celebration that takes place every year in Ponce, Puerto Rico. The festival centers around the genip fruit, the city's official fruit. The celebration lasts three days and takes place over a weekend (Friday through Sunday). It is generally held on the second weekend of August, but occasionally during a weekend in September. It is sponsored by the Oficina de Desarrollo Cultural (Office of Cultural Development) of the Ponce Municipal Government.

History 

The festival is one of the newest in the Puerto Rico. It was started in 2008. It was proposed in January 2008 by Jorge Fernández Torres, a municipal government employee, to the Municipal Government, who accepted and adopted the idea.

It takes place at Plaza Las Delicias, the city's central square. The festival takes place during August, but sometimes in September. The event has been held, at least once, at Parque Ecológico Urbano. Four varieties of quenepas are grown in Puerto Rico, with one of them named after the city of Ponce. The city of Ponce is known as La Ciudad de las Quenepas (Genip City), not because of any quenepa farms, but because the fruit is so commonly grown in city residents' backyards.

Events 
The festival includes arts and crafts, food, folkloric music, games, and plenty of farmers market quenepas. It also includes a competition for the most unusual quenepa-based dish. All the activities of the festival center on the genip fruit. As such, much of the foods, from cakes to juices, are based genip fruit recipes. Likewise, crafts are made, displayed and sold that are based on the seed of the genip fruit. The Second annual Festival de la Quenepa included cakes, custards, juices, jellies, frappes, and rice with quenepas, among others. It is organized as a family event, with activities for children, such as games, and clowns.

See also 
 Carnaval de Ponce
 Feria de Artesanías de Ponce
 Ponce Jazz Festival
 Fiesta Nacional de la Danza
 Día Mundial de Ponce
 Bienal de Arte de Ponce
 Las Mañanitas
 Festival de Bomba y Plena de San Antón
 Carnaval de Vejigantes
 Festival Nacional Afrocaribeño

Notes

References 

Carnivals in Puerto Rico
August events
Food and drink festivals in Puerto Rico
Annual events in Puerto Rico
2008 in Puerto Rico
Festivals in Ponce, Puerto Rico
Fairs in Puerto Rico
2008 establishments in Puerto Rico
Cultural festivals in Puerto Rico